The New Tristano is an album by jazz pianist Lennie Tristano. It was recorded in 1961 and was released by Atlantic Records in February 1962.

Background
Lennie Tristano seldom recorded; this was his first album for Atlantic Records since his eponymous album was released in 1956. That album had been controversial for its use of overdubbing and tape speed alteration; the cover of The New Tristano album contained the words "Lennie Tristano is heard on this LP in unaccompanied piano solos. No use is made of multi-tracking, overdubbing, or tape-speeding on any selection."

Recording and Music
The album consists of seven solo piano tracks – six are Tristano originals; the other is the standard "You Don't Know What Love Is". The Tristano compositions are "based on standards: 'Becoming' ('What Is This Thing Called Love?'), 'Deliberation' ('Indiana'), 'Scene and Variations' ('My Melancholy Baby'), 'Love Lines' ('Foolin' Myself'), and 'G Minor Complex' ('You'd Be So Nice to Come Home To')."

The performances are largely improvised. Most of the tracks contain left-hand bass lines that provide structure to each performance as well as counterpoint for the right-hand playing; block chords, unclear harmonies and contrasting rhythms also appear. "Scene and Variations" differs, particularly in its third part, which does not feature a walking bass line.

Reception
Critic Ira Gitler stated that the album is "a remarkable tour de force". Pianist Alan Broadbent described The New Tristano as "the greatest solo jazz piano album bar none." The Penguin Guide to Jazz indicated that, "Howsoever the conjoining of technique, interpretation and feeling may work for the listener, this is remarkable piano jazz, and the contrasting ballads of 'You Don't Know What Love Is' and 'Love Lines' suggest a world of expression which jazz has seldom looked at since."

Track listing
All songs composed by Lennie Tristano, unless otherwise noted.

"Becoming"
"C Minor Complex"
"You Don't Know What Love Is" (Gene de Paul, Don Raye)
"Deliberation"
"Scene and Variations: Carol/Tania/Bud"
"Love Lines"
"G Minor Complex"

Personnel

Musicians
Lennie Tristano – piano

Production
Lennie Tristano – recording engineering
Lee Friedlander – cover photography
Loring Eutemey – cover design
Barry Ulanov – liner notes

References

Bibliography

1962 albums
Atlantic Records albums
Lennie Tristano albums
Solo piano jazz albums